Nikolay Nikolaevich Afanasevsky (1 October 1940 – 23 June 2005) was a Russian diplomat.

Born in Moscow, Afanasevsky graduated from the Moscow State Institute of International Relations in 1964 and went on to work in various diplomatic posts in the central offices of the Ministry of Foreign Affairs and abroad.

From 1990 to 1992, he was the Ambassador of the Soviet Union in Belgium and continued as the Russian Ambassador until 1994. He served as Ambassador to France from January 1999 to March 2002, and was appointed as Ambassador of Russia to Poland from March 2002 until his death in Warsaw on 23 June 2005.

References 

1940 births
2005 deaths
Burials in Troyekurovskoye Cemetery
Moscow State Institute of International Relations alumni
Ambassador Extraordinary and Plenipotentiary (Soviet Union)
Ambassadors of the Soviet Union to Belgium
Ambassadors of Russia to Belgium
Ambassadors of Russia to France
Ambassadors of Russia to Poland